Calytrix depressa is a species of shrub in the family Myrtaceae, endemic to the south-west of Western Australia.

Description 
The species can grow up to 2 metres in height, but is usually between 0.2 and 1 metre high in its native range. The leaves are  linear to cylindrical and usually around 1 cm in length. The leaves have a flattened base, which is alluded to in the Latin specific epithet depressa. Numerous flowers, each about 1 to 1.3 cm in diameter,  cover the plant in summer . Northern forms have pink to light purple colouring on the outer petals and a contrasting yellow centre, while all-yellow forms are found in the south. The petals are wider than many other Calytrix species. As with most species in the genus,  the calyx lobes have prominent awns that extend well-beyond the extent of the petals.

Cultivation
This species requires a moist but well-drained position, with filtered sunlight.
The species may be propagated from cuttings or seed, the latter resulting in stronger plants although difficult to germinate. Plants may sometimes be affected by  root rot in hot, humid climates, or scale.

Distribution
The species occurs in the Southwest Botanical Province  and the Eremaean Botanical Province

References

depressa
Endemic flora of Southwest Australia
Myrtales of Australia
Rosids of Western Australia
Taxa named by George Bentham